Behavioral and Brain Sciences is a bimonthly peer-reviewed scientific journal of Open Peer Commentary established in 1978 by Stevan Harnad and published by Cambridge University Press. It is modeled on the journal Current Anthropology (which was established in 1959 by the University of Chicago anthropologist, Sol Tax).

The journal publishes "target articles" followed by 10 to 30 or more peer commentaries and the response of the authors of the target article. The journal covers all areas of the biobehavioral and cognitive sciences (psychology, neuroscience, behavioral biology, cognitive science, artificial intelligence, linguistics, philosophy) and articles are judged by four or more referees to be of sufficient importance and interdisciplinary scope to merit Open Peer Commentary. Volume 1 appeared in 1978 and issues appeared quarterly; as its popularity grew it switched to a bimonthly schedule in 1997.

Abstracting and indexing
According to the Journal Citation Reports, the journal has a 2019 impact factor of 17.333.

References

External links

Neuroscience journals
Psychology journals
Cognitive science journals
Publications established in 1978
Cambridge University Press academic journals
Bimonthly journals
English-language journals